Miantochora is a genus of moths in the family Geometridae first described by Warren in 1895.

Species
Miantochora inaequilinea Warren, 1895
Miantochora siniaevi Herbulot, 2002
Miantochora rufaria (Swinhoe, 1904)

References

External links
 With images.

Ennominae